The Wilson Trail is a  long-distance footpath in Hong Kong, 63 km of which runs through Hong Kong country parks. It was named after David Wilson, Baron Wilson of Tillyorn, who was Governor of Hong Kong from 1987 to 1992. The Wilson Trail was developed by Friends of the Country Park and sponsored by various private organisations. The construction work of the trail began in 1994. The Wilson Trail was first opened on 21 January 1996.

In all, the Wilson Trail traverses eight of the Country Parks. On Hong Kong Island, Tai Tam Country Park and the adjacent Quarry Bay Country Park begin the journey. Across the harbour, there is a gap where the trail runs through hills outside the parks. Then come the three parks named Ma On Shan, Lion Rock, and Kam Shan. In the central New Territories, the Wilson Trail heads north through Shing Mun Country Park and Tai Mo Shan Country Park. Finally it climbs into the majestic Pat Sin Leng Country Park. Each of the Country Parks the Wilson Trail traverses has its individual character and appeal – offering, as one proceeds from south to north, changing settings with much of interest.

The trail is aligned north-south and runs from Stanley, in the south of Hong Kong Island to Nam Chung, in the northeastern New Territories. Of the four long-distance trails, the Wilson Trail is the newest. Since the trail crosses Victoria Harbour, it makes use of the MTRTseung Kwan O line or buses.

Sections
The Wilson Trail is divided into ten sections: and is marked by distance posts W001 – W137. Although the other major Hong Kong trails measure distance posts every 500m, the distances between posts on the Wilson Trail range from 500m – 650m.

Between Sections 2 and 3, it is necessary to take the MTR from Tai Koo Station (just near the end of Section 2 on Greig Road) to Yau Tong Station and then walk to W020 at the base of Devil's Peak. Previously, Section 3 started at Lam Tin Station but with the opening of Yau Tong Station it was moved.

 Easy Walk
 Fairly Difficult
 Very Difficult

Errors
Wilson Trail is one of the newest long-distance trails in Hong Kong. However, many hikers find the sign posts are unclear and full of errors. One of the most significant problems is that there are only 137 distance posts along the 78 km trail. They are supposed to be at 500-metre intervals. There are also complaints that some signs are missing or misplaced. However, the situation has improved in the recent years.

Raleigh Challenge
Raleigh International's "Raleigh Challenge - Wilson Trail" is the first hiking competition which covered the longest distance of the Wilson Trail, spanning across the Hong Kong Island, the Kowloon Peninsula and the New Territories from south to north.

See also
Hong Kong Country Parks & Special Areas

References

External links

Tai Tam Country Park by Hong Kong Government
Raleigh Challenge-Wilson Trail

Hiking trails in Hong Kong
Tai Tam